The following is a list of The Fall Guy  TV series episodes that aired on ABC from 1981 through 1986 starring Lee Majors.

Series overview
<onlyinclude>

Episodes

Season 1 (1981–82)

Season 2 (1982–83)

Season 3 (1983–84)

Season 4 (1984–85)

Season 5 (1985–86)

References

Fall Guy, The